The Alexander Young Hotel was one of the first hotels in downtown Honolulu, Hawaii, opened in 1903. The hotel closed and was converted to offices in 1964. The structure was demolished in 1981.

History 
The Alexander Young Hotel was constructed from 1900-1903, at a cost of $2 million, by Scottish-born Honolulu sugar and iron works magnate Alexander Young. The 192-room hotel was designed by California architect George W. Percy. It was his last major commission before he died on December 14, 1900. 

The hotel opened on July 31, 1903, with a gala reception attended by 2000 people. It quickly became a social center for the city. Young expanded his hotel empire, the Territorial Hotel Company, by purchasing the Moana Hotel on Waikiki Beach in 1905 and later the first Royal Hawaiian Hotel in downtown Honolulu. After his death, in 1910, the company also purchased the Honolulu Seaside Hotel, adjacent to the Moana.  Young "became known as the father of the hotel industry in Hawaii."

In 1917, the United States Army used the second floor of the Alexander Young Hotel, while Fort Shafter was completed. Later that year, the Army & Navy YMCA purchased the first Royal Hawaiian Hotel from the Territorial Hotel Company. The interwar years saw the hotel's Roof Garden become one of Honolulu's most fashionable social venues. Hawaii's first post-Prohibition cocktail lounge license was issued to the hotel in 1933, and the hotel opened Hawaii's first air-conditioned dining room in 1937.

The Matson Navigation Company and Castle & Cooke bought a controlling interest in the Territorial Hotel Company in 1925, in order to demolish their Honolulu Seaside Hotel and construct the modern Royal Hawaiian Hotel on the site. Matson also acquired the Moana with this purchase, but the Alexander Young Hotel's ownership was transferred to the Alexander Young Building Co.

During World War II the military occupied most of the hotel. The Alexander Young Hotel closed and was converted to offices in 1964. The structure was listed on the National Register of Historic Places on August 5, 1980 as the Alexander Young Building. The building was demolished, however, in 1981.  The site was removed from the National Register in October 2009.

References

Buildings and structures on the National Register of Historic Places in Hawaii
Hotel buildings completed in 1903
Hotels established in 1903
Hotels in Honolulu
Office buildings in Hawaii
National Register of Historic Places in Honolulu
Demolished buildings and structures in Hawaii
Demolished hotels in the United States
Buildings and structures demolished in 1981
Former_National_Register_of_Historic_Places_in_Hawaii